Pseudochromis pylei, the Pyle's dottyback, is a species of ray-finned fish from the western central Pacific Ocean, which is a member of the family Pseudochromidae.

Entymology
The fish is named for Robert M. Pyle, who described with J. E. Randall two species" Cirrhilabrus scottorum J. E. Randall & R. M. Pyle, 1989 and Rabaulichthys stigmaticus J. E. Randall & R. M. Pyle, 1989.

References

pylei
Taxa named by John E. McCosker
Taxa named by John Ernest Randall
Fish described in 1989
Fish of the Pacific Ocean